James John Grimwood Sales (born 11 February 2003) is an English cricketer. He made his List A debut on 8 August 2021, for Northamptonshire in the 2021 Royal London One-Day Cup. He made his first-class debut on 5 September 2021, for Northamptonshire in the 2021 County Championship. His father David Sales was also a professional cricketer for Northamptonshire.

In December 2021, he was named in England's team for the 2022 ICC Under-19 Cricket World Cup in the West Indies. He made his Twenty20 debut on 26 May 2022, for the Northants Steelbacks in the 2022 T20 Blast.

References

External links
 

2003 births
Living people
English cricketers
Northamptonshire cricketers
Cricketers from Northampton